Alyokhin ( also transliterated as Alekhin or Alekhine or Aljechin) is a Russian-language surname derived form the given name "Alyokha", a diminutive for "Aleksey". Feminine form: Alyokhina/Alekhina (.)

 Maria Alyokhina, Russian political activist
Andrey Alekhin (born 1959), Russian politician 
Nikolai Alekhin (1913–1964), Soviet Union rocket designer
Alexander Alekhine, Russian-French chess player

See also
Alekhine (disambiguation)
Alekhin (disambiguation)

Russian-language surnames